Oligodon meyerinkii is a species of snake of the family Colubridae. It is commonly known as the Sulu short-headed snake and Meyerink's kukri snake.

Geographic range
The snake is found in the Philippines on the islands of Bongao, Jolo, Sibutu and Tawi-Tawi in Sulu Archipelago, and possibly in the Malaysian state of Sabah on Borneo.

References

meyerinkii
Reptiles described in 1891
Reptiles of the Philippines
Taxa named by Franz Steindachner